The 2022 Republic of Buryatia head election took place on 11 September 2022, on common election day. Incumbent Head Alexey Tsydenov was re-elected to a second term.

Background
Deputy Minister of Transport Alexey Tsydenov was appointed Head of Buryatia in February 2017. He successfully won election to a full term with 87% of the vote.

Due to the start of Russian special military operation in Ukraine in February 2022 and subsequent economic sanctions the cancellation and postponement of direct gubernatorial elections was proposed. The measure was even supported by A Just Russia leader Sergey Mironov.

However, Aleksey Tsydenov publicly supported direct head election. On 31 May President Vladimir Putin endorsed Tsydenov for reelection. On 9 June People's Khural of the Republic of Buryatia called head election for 11 September 2022.

Candidates
Only political parties can nominate candidates for head election in Buryatia, self-nomination is not possible. However, candidate is not obliged to be a member of the nominating party. Candidate for Head of Buryatia should be a Russian citizen and at least 30 years old. Each candidate in order to be registered is required to collect at least 7% of signatures of members and heads of municipalities (207-217 signatures). Also gubernatorial candidates present 3 candidacies to the Federation Council and election winner later appoints one of the presented candidates.

Registered
 Sergey Dorosh (LDPR), Member of People's Khural of the Republic of Buryatia, 2017 head candidate
 Viktor Malyshenko (CPRF), Member of People's Khural of the Republic of Buryatia
 Semyon Matkheyev (New People), businessman
 Alexey Tsydenov (United Russia), incumbent Head of Buryatia

Declined
 Igor Bobkov (RPPSS), Member of People's Khural of the Republic of Buryatia
 Vyacheslav Markhayev (CPRF), Member of State Duma, 2017 head candidate

Candidates for Federation Council
Sergey Dorosh (LDPR):
Yulia Maltseva, accountant
Dmitry Teslenko, physician
Badmadorzho Zhigzhitov, Member of People's Khural of the Republic of Buryatia
Viktor Malyshenko (CPRF):
Anatoly Kovalev, Member of People's Khural of the Republic of Buryatia
Vyacheslav Markhayev, Member of State Duma, former Senator from Irkutsk Oblast (2015-2020), 2017 head candidate
Bair Tsyrenov, Member of People's Khural of the Republic of Buryatia
Semyon Matkheyev (New People):
Maksim Buvalin, general director of "Ulan-Ude Energo"
Aldar Galsanov, unemployed
Shirap Khaludorov, aide to State Duma member Georgy Arapov
Aleksey Tsydenov (United Russia):
Leonid Belykh, former general director of Ulan-Ude Aviation Plant (1998-2021)
Tatyana Mantatova, Deputy Chair of People's Khural of the Republic of Buryatia, former Senator from Buryatia (2017)
Vyacheslav Nagovitsyn, incumbent Senator

Finances
All sums are in rubles.

Results

|- style="background-color:#E9E9E9;text-align:center;"
! style="text-align:left;" colspan=2| Candidate
! style="text-align:left;"| Party
! width="75"|Votes
! width="30"|%
|-
| style="background-color:;"|
| style="text-align:left;"| Alexey Tsydenov (incumbent)
| style="text-align:left;"| United Russia
| 235,380
| 86.23
|-
| style="background-color:|
| style="text-align:left;"| Viktor Malyshenko
| style="text-align:left;"| Communist Party
| 19,429
| 7.12
|-
| style="background-color:;"|
| style="text-align:left;"| Sergey Dorosh
| style="text-align:left;"| Liberal Democratic Party
| 7,264
| 2.66
|-
| style="background-color:;"|
| style="text-align:left;"| Semyon Matkheyev
| style="text-align:left;"| New People
| 6,414
| 2.35
|-
| style="text-align:left;" colspan="3"| Valid votes
| 268,487
| 98.36
|-
| style="text-align:left;" colspan="3"| Blank ballots
| 4,479
| 1.64
|- style="font-weight:bold"
| style="text-align:left;" colspan="3"| Total
| 272,966
| 100.00
|-
| style="background-color:#E9E9E9;" colspan="6"|
|-
| style="text-align:left;" colspan="3"| Turnout
| 272,966
| 39.41
|-
| style="text-align:left;" colspan="3"| Registered voters
| 692,590
| 100.00
|-
| colspan="5" style="background-color:#E9E9E9;"|
|- style="font-weight:bold"
| colspan="4" |Source:
|
|}

Incumbent Senator Vyacheslav Nagovitsyn (United Russia) was re-appointed to the Federation Council.

See also
2022 Russian gubernatorial elections

References

Buryatia
Buryatia
Politics of Buryatia